Roony Bardghji (pronounced ; born 15 November 2005) is a Swedish professional footballer who plays as a midfielder for Copenhagen.

Club career
Arriving in Sweden in 2012, Bardghji played for youth teams of Kallinge SK, Rödeby AIF and Malmö FF. In 2020 he moved from Malmö to Copenhagen. On 21 November 2021 he made his senior debut for Copenhagen against AGF in the Danish Superliga. Seven days later he scored his first goal for Copenhagen in a 3–1 against AaB.

On 7 January 2023 he signed a new contract, extending his contract to December 2025.

International career
Bardghji was born in Kuwait to a Syrian family, and moved to Sweden at a young age. He is a current Sweden under-21 international.

Career statistics

Club

Honours
Copenhagen
 Danish Superliga: 2021–22

References

External links
 

2005 births
Living people
Sportspeople from Kuwait City
Swedish footballers
Sweden youth international footballers
Swedish people of Syrian descent
Syrian emigrants to Sweden
Association football midfielders
Danish Superliga players
F.C. Copenhagen players